The European Kendo Championships are an international kendo competition contested by the member nations of the European Kendo Federation (EKF). EKF is the international federation of kendo associations in Europe as well as the governing body for members of EKF. The championships have been conducted generally every year except when there is a scheduled World Kendo Championship the same year, the first EKC's inception being in 1974. The competition is divided into 6 divisions: Men's Team, Women's Team, Junior Team, Men's Individual, Women's Individual, Junior Individual. Team matches are individual between 5 members from each team which change sequentially at the end of each round, except in the Junior category which is between 3 members from each team, male or female.

Medal table

Men's Teams Division

The following is a summary of medals acquired by country for the Men's Teams Division.

Medal table

Men's individuals Division

The following is a summary of medals acquired by country for the Men's individuals Division.

Individual Champions (Men)

Women's team

The following is a summary of medals acquired by country for the Women's Team Division.

Individual Champions (Women)

Summary of championships

References 
Hosts
Results